On the night of 5-6 May 2014, Boko Haram militants attacked the twin towns of Gamboru and Ngala in Borno State, northeastern Nigeria. About 310 residents were killed in the 12-hour massacre, and the town was largely destroyed.

During the same night, Boko Haram abducted eight girls aged between 12–15 from northeast Nigeria, a number later raised to eleven.

Background
Gamboru Ngala accommodated the security garrison, which had left the town before the attack to pursue the perpetrators of the Chibok schoolgirl kidnapping. Borno State is considered pivotal for Boko Haram. According to the Nigerian senator Ahmed Zanna and several residents, the security forces left Gamboru Ngala after Boko Haram militants had spread rumours that the kidnapped schoolgirls had been spotted elsewhere.

Massacre
Armed with AK-47s and RPGs, the militants attacked the town on two armored personnel carriers, stolen from the Nigerian military several months earlier. The militants opened fire on the people at a busy market that was open at night when temperatures cool. Having set homes ablaze, the militants gunned down residents who tried to escape from the fire. 

The official death toll was first set at 200 on 7 May. Zanna and local resident Waziri Hassan both reported at least 336 deaths.

References

2014 murders in Nigeria
2014 mass shootings in Africa
2010s in Borno State
2010s massacres in Nigeria
Arson in Nigeria
Arson in the 2010s
Attacks on buildings and structures in 2014
Attacks on buildings and structures in Nigeria
Massacres perpetrated by Boko Haram
Islamic terrorist incidents in 2014
Marketplace attacks
Mass murder in Borno State
Mass shootings in Nigeria
Massacres in 2014
May 2014 crimes in Africa
May 2014 events in Nigeria
Terrorist incidents in Borno State
Terrorist incidents in Nigeria in 2014
Attacks in Nigeria in 2014